Florian Kohfeldt (born 5 October 1982) is a German football manager who last managed VfL Wolfsburg.

Managerial career
From 2006, Kohfeldt coached various youth teams of Werder Bremen. From the 2014–15 season, Kohfeldt worked as assistant manager of Bremen, under head coach Viktor Skrypnyk. On 2 October 2016, it was announced that Kohfeldt would become head coach of Werder Bremen II, effective as of the following day.

Kohfeldt was appointed interim manager of Werder Bremen on 30 October 2017 following Alexander Nouri's dismissal. He finished with a record of 12 wins, 14 draws, and 16 losses in 42 matches with the reserve team. In November he became the permanent manager of Werder Bremen.
In April 2018, he agreed a contract extension with the club until summer 2021.

In July 2019, he agreed a two-year contract extension with the club until 2023. He was sacked on 16 May 2021.

On 26 October 2021, Kohfeldt was appointed manager of VfL Wolfsburg, signing a two-year contract. He was relieved of his duties on 15 May 2022.

Personal life
Kohfeldt has a Master of Arts in public health, and a football instructor license of the DFB.

Managerial record

References

External links

1982 births
Sportspeople from Siegen
Living people
German football managers
3. Liga managers
SV Werder Bremen managers
Bundesliga managers
SV Werder Bremen II managers
SV Werder Bremen non-playing staff
VfL Wolfsburg managers
Footballers from North Rhine-Westphalia
Association football goalkeepers
Association football players not categorized by nationality